Baby It's Me is the eighth studio album by American singer Diana Ross, released on September 16, 1977 by Motown Records. It peaked at No. 18 on the Billboard Top 200 and No. 7 on the R&B album chart. The album was produced by producer Richard Perry. The LP yielded one top 40 hit, "Gettin' Ready for Love", reaching number 27 on the US Billboard Hot 100. Other charting singles released from the album include "You Got It" and "Your Love Is So Good for Me", the latter receiving a Grammy nomination.

The album also included cover versions of songs written and previously recorded by Stevie Wonder, Bill Withers and Melissa Manchester.

Adult Contemporary airplay drove the success of this album, with both "Gettin' Ready for Love" (#8) and "You Got It" (#9) being top 10 hits on that chart, while the newly formed Billboard Dance charts ranked "Your Love Is So Good for Me" top 15. Although this album never made the UK charts, it was certified silver for UK sales in excess of 60,000 copies.

Ross would continue to work with Perry including on her pairing with international vocalist Julio Iglesias on their duet, "All of You" several years later.

The album was re-released in 2014 in an Expanded Edition with 11 extra tracks (in digital format only). The bonus tracks included 2014 mixes of a number of the original cuts (often in longer unedited versions with additional vocals) as well as four unreleased songs from the album sessions; "Brass Band", "Country John", "Room Enough for Two" and a cover version of Peter Frampton's 1975 hit "Baby, I Love Your Way".

Track listing

Personnel
Diana Ross – lead vocals (all tracks)
James Newton Howard – keyboards, synthesizers (4)
Tom Scott – saxophone solo (1)
Bud Shank – flute (7)
David Foster – horns arrangements, conductor (3)
Clydie King – background vocals (6)
Tom Snow – acoustic piano (1, 6), Fender Rhodes piano (7, 8, 10)
Bobbye Hall – congas (7) 
Jack Ashford – percussion (1, 6), hotel sheet (3), tambourine (7)
Ben Benay – guitar (9)
Pattie Brooks – background vocals (2, 7)
Ollie E. Brown – drums (9)
Lenny Castro – percussion (2, 3, 9)
Don Dunn – guitar (3)
Scott Edwards – bass guitar (9)
Chuck Findley – horn (5)
Bryan Garofalo – bass guitar (8, 10)
Ed Greene – drums (7)
Jim Horn – horn (5)
David Hungate – bass guitar (1-3, 6, 7)
Bobby Kimball – background vocals (5)
Becky Lewis – background vocals (2, 7)
Steve Lukather – guitar (1, 6)
Ira Newborn – guitar (7, 8, 10), horns arrangements, conductor (8)
Michael Omartian – Fender Rhodes piano (2, 3)
David Paich – Fender Rhodes piano (7, 9), acoustic piano (7), organ (5), vocals (5)
Jeff Porcaro – drums (1-3, 5, 6), syndrums (all tracks)
Ray Parker Jr. – bass guitar (5), guitar (2, 3, 5, 9)
Ken Peterson – Fender Rhodes piano, synthesizers, clavinet (5)
Petsye Powell – background vocals (2, 7)
Lee Ritenour – guitar (2, 3, 8, 10)
Stanley Schwartz – acoustic piano (8, 10)
Rick Shlosser – drums (8, 10)
Richie Zito – guitar (7)
Sherlie Matthews – background vocals (6)
Gene Page - string arrangements, conductor (1, 2, 6, 9)
Del Newman - string arrangements, conductor (4, 6, 10)
Richard Hewson - string arrangement, conductor
Technical (7)
Howard Steele - recording and remix engineer
David Larkham - art direction
Victor Skrebneski - photography

Charts

Weekly charts

Year-end charts

Certifications

References

External links
 Allmusic.com, charts and awards album Baby It's Me, Billboard magazine.
 Discogs.com, album Baby It's Me.
 Rateyourmusic.com, album Baby It's Me.

1977 albums
Diana Ross albums
Albums arranged by Gene Page
Albums produced by Richard Perry
The Muppets songs
Motown albums